The Kamula–Elevala languages are a small family of the Trans–New Guinea languages spoken in the region of the Elevala River.

Languages
There are three languages, namely Aekyowm (Awin), Pare (Pa), and Kamula. They are not obviously related to each other, but Aekyowm and Pare are closer to each other than to Kamula.
Kamula
Awin–Pa (Elevala River)
Aekyowm (Awin)
Pare (Pa)

A more in-depth classification by Suter and Usher (2017) is as follows.
Kamula-Elevala family
Kamula [1,100 speakers in 2000]
Elevala (= Awin-Pare) family
Pa (= Pare, Ba, Debepare) [6,500 speakers in 2000]
Aekyom (= Awin, Akium) [21,100 speakers in 2000]
Northeastern (= Aekyom-Skai)
North Central
Southeastern (= Aekyom-Pare)
Western

Classification
Stephen Wurm (1975) added Awin and Pa to an expanded Central and South New Guinea branch of TNG, a position reversed by Ross (2005). The connection between Awin–Pa and Kamula was established by Suter & Usher.

Reconstruction

Phonology 
Usher (2020) reconstructs the consonant and vowel inventories as follows:

{| 
| *m || *n ||  ||  
|-
| *p (or *h) || *t || *s || *k 
|-
| *b (or *p) || *d ||  || *g 
|-
|  || *s ||  ||  
|-
| *w ||  || *j ||  
|}

{| 
| *i ||  || *u
|-
| *e ||  || *o 
|-
|  ||  || *ɔ
|-
| *æ || *a ||  
|}

There is also the diphthong *ai.

Pronouns
Usher (2020) reconstructs the Awin–Pa pronouns as:
{| 
! !!sg!!du!!pl
|-
!1
|*nɔ||*ni, *ki||
|-
!2
|*go||*gi||
|-
!3
|*jɔ|| ||
|}

In the 1du, Awin has /ki/ and Pare /ni/, /niki/, /nigi/. The Kamula singular forms are quite similar (na, wa, je), but it does not have the dual.

Vocabulary
Some Proto-Kamula-Elevala lexical reconstructions by Usher (2020) are:

{| class="wikitable sortable"
! gloss !! Proto-Kamula-Elevala
|-
| head || *ke̝ba
|-
| ear || *m[ɔ/o̝]d[ɔ/o̝]
|-
| eye || *kinɔ
|-
| nose || *kine̝
|-
| tusk/tooth || *bate̝
|-
| tongue/flame || *taⁱ
|-
| knee/leg || *tama
|-
| bone || *ke̝dɔ
|-
| louse || *awV
|-
| dog || *ti
|-
| pig || *m₂aⁱnæ
|-
| bird || *te̝ja
|-
| egg/fruit/seed || *m[ɔ/o̝]k[ɔ/o̝]
|-
| tree || *je̝
|-
| man || *k[ɔ/o̝]b[a/ɔ]
|-
| sun/day || *gani
|-
| stone || *ike̝
|-
| name || *pi
|-
| eat/drink || *de̝-
|-
| one || *tV[n/d]o̝
|}

Below are all of the lexical reconstructions of Proto-Kamula-Elevala from Suter and Usher (2017):

{| class="wikitable sortable"
! gloss !! Proto-Kamula-Elevala
|-
| house || *aja
|-
| mushroom || *ap(ɔ,o)
|-
| hear || *dade-
|-
| where? || *dai
|-
| sago || *daja
|-
| eat, drink || *de-
|-
| burn, cook || *du-
|-
| middle || *dunu
|-
| brother || *ei
|-
| sun, day || *gani
|-
| belly, bowels || *gene
|-
| leech || *gimada
|-
| hold || *hamV-
|-
| upright || *hane
|-
| name || *hi
|-
| light (in weight) || *hodoka
|-
| stand, stay || *hV-
|-
| sago thatch || *jeme
|-
| hit || *jV-
|-
| bone || *kedɔ
|-
| man || *kopo
|-
| now, today || *kwa-
|-
| thigh || *madina
|-
| shoulder || *makæ
|-
| know || *maN(æ,a)-
|-
| teeth, mouth || *mat(e,i)
|-
| kindle || *mi-
|-
| son, child || *mi
|-
| body || *mot(e,i)
|-
| joint || *mu
|-
| tusk || *patæ
|-
| skin disease || *peseni
|-
| die || *po-
|-
| tie, wrap || *podi
|-
| pierce, burst || *poko-
|-
| heart, pity || *pɔdɔw(e,a)
|-
| be soft || *pɔpɔtæ-
|-
| close eyes || *pudi-
|-
| sit || *pV-
|-
| speech || *sa
|-
| rafter || *saka
|-
| paddle || *sode
|-
| tongue || *tai
|-
| afternoon || *tamide
|-
| make, do || *ti-
|-
| embers || *tine
|-
| bow (for arrows) || *tɔ
|-
| upstream || *t(ɔ,o)t(ɔ,o)
|-
| thorn || *tu
|-
| banana || *tuma
|-
| go || *tV-
|-
| one || *tVdo
|-
| illicit || *u
|-
| scar || *ud(e,i)
|-
| urine || *ute
|-
| grub || *wæja
|-
| left (hand) || *weke
|}

Proto-Elevala
Proto-Elevala reconstructions from Suter and Usher (2017):

{| class="wikitable sortable"
! gloss !! Proto-Elevala
|-
| hand, arm || *a
|-
| lie down || *æ-
|-
| sand || *daNi
|-
| give || *dæ-
|-
| flea || *dideme
|-
| meat || *dinæ
|-
| testicles || *dipɔ
|-
| crocodile || *dope
|-
| sap, juice || *dɔdæ
|-
| fingernail || *d(ɔ,a)kæ
|-
| see || *dV-
|-
| sugarcane || *ga
|-
| beak || *ga
|-
| sing || *gi-
|-
| gums || *gine
|-
| younger brother || *gɔmɔde
|-
| cut || *gu
|-
| stick || *gum(ɔ,a)
|-
| count || *hiakV-
|-
| breath || *hine
|-
| do, make || *hɔmV-
|-
| carry on head || *i-
|-
| stone || *ike
|-
| song || *jɔkæ
|-
| set on fire || *kamV-
|-
| leg || *kate
|-
| beetle || *kiame
|-
| thunder || *kima(ti)
|-
| nose || *kine
|-
| face || *kiNɔ-namæ58
|-
| white || *kɔnV-kaina59
|-
| coconut || *kɔpɔkæ
|-
| pig || *mainæ
|-
| head || *mini
|-
| below || *moka
|-
| fish || *mone
|-
| stem || *moNæ
|-
| what? || *na
|-
| cane mail shirt || *napo
|-
| charcoal || *o
|-
| drum || *pi
|-
| heavy || *piena
|-
| buttocks || *po
|-
| smell || *pɔmæ
|-
| bride price || *puNe
|-
| goanna || *sɔNɔmæ
|-
| yesterday || *te
|-
| sago thatch || *temæ
|-
| rattan || *tike
|-
| ground, earth || *tɔ
|-
| wild || *tɔna
|}

Vocabulary comparison
The following basic vocabulary words are from McElhanon & Voorhoeve (1970), Shaw (1973), and Shaw (1986), as cited in the Trans-New Guinea database:

{| class="wikitable sortable"
! gloss !! Pare !! Aekyom
|-
! head
| keba; kiba || pɔƀe
|-
! hair
| osɛ; ouse || tɛnɛ
|-
! ear
| mogamɛ; mogo; mɔgɔ || kɛndɔkɛ
|-
! eye
| kere-mo; kinemo; kinemɔ || krO-ŋɛ
|-
! nose
| kene; kine || koe
|-
! tooth
| male; marɛ; pɛrɛ || pʰɛtɛ
|-
! tongue
| tɛ || tiː
|-
! leg
| tamakali || 
|-
! louse
| kiba ʔo; kiba ʔɔ; ɔ || huɔlɛ
|-
! dog
| ti; til || psane
|-
! pig
| mele || 
|-
! bird
| tie; tiye || 
|-
! egg
| moʔo; mɔʔɔ || 
|-
! blood
| sowo; sɔwɔ || 
|-
! bone
| ko; kɔ || kro
|-
! skin
| sia; siga; siya || kare
|-
! breast
| bu || tutɛ
|-
! tree
| i̧; ĩ || de; doe
|-
! man
| kobo || 
|-
! woman
| wigi || 
|-
! sun
| gẽnɛ̃; gine || toe
|-
! moon
| abi || 
|-
! water
| mɔa; omɛ; ɔmɔɛ; ume || waɛ
|-
! fire
| ne; nɛ || de; doe
|-
! stone
| iebɔ; iyebo || 
|-
! road, path
| utigi || tɛnɛ
|-
! name
| hi || hi
|-
! eat
| da; denu; de-nu || də
|-
! one
| oteso; ɔtesɔ || 
|-
! two
| diyabo; diyabɔ || 
|-
! String Bag
| dissa; disaɔ ||
|}

Evolution
Proposed Awin–Pa reflexes of proto-Trans-New Guinea (pTNG) etyma:

Aekyom language:
kendoke ‘ear’ < *kand(e,i)k[V]
khatike ‘leg’ < *k(a,o)
ndok[V], kare ‘skin’ < *(ŋg,k)a(nd,t)apu
di ‘firewood, fire’ < *inda

Pa language:
keba ‘head’ < *kV(mb,p)(i,u)tu
ama ‘mother < *am(a,i)
di- ‘burn’ < *nj(a,e,i)

Loanwords

Kamula and Doso
Loanwords between Kamula and Doso:

{| class="wikitable"
! No. !! Kamula !! Doso !! Turumsa
|-
| 1 ||  'father' || [a:] 'father' || [a:] 'father'
|-
| 2 ||  'mother' || ['wai] 'mother' || ['wai] 'mother'
|-
| 3 ||  'older brother' || ['bapa] 'older brother' || 
|-
| 4 ||  'older sister' || ['nana] 'older sister' || 
|-
| 5 ||  'blood' || ['omari] 'blood' || 
|-
| 6 ||  'stomach' ||  || [kù'ko] 'belly (outside)'
|-
| 7 ||  'wallaby' || [ka'pia] 'wallaby' || [kapia] 'wallaby'
|-
| 8 ||  'cassowary' || [wa:taɾa] 'cassowary' || [wa:taɾa] 'cassowary'
|-
| 9 ||  'cloud' || ['waɾa] 'cloud' || 
|-
| 10 ||  'sand' || ['asiɾa] 'sand' || 
|}

Aekyom and Ok
Aekyom loanwords from Ok languages:

{| class="wikitable"
! No. !! Aekyom !! Mountain Ok !! Lowland Ok
|-
| 1 || [mon] 'rubbish' || *mɔːn 'rubbish, compost' || 
|-
| 2 || [ɺoŋ] 'garden newly felled' || *ɾaŋg 'garden' || *joŋg 'garden'
|-
| 3 || [khno] 'canoe' ||  || *kono 'canoe'
|-
| 4 || [ambum(e)] 'turtle' || *ambɔːm 'turtle species' || *ambom 'turtle'
|-
| 5 || [khwiɺe] 'hornbill' || *kaweːɾ 'Papuan hornbill' || *kaweɾ 'hornbill'
|-
| 6 || [ubine] 'rhinoceros beetle' || *umiːn 'rhinoceros beetle' || 
|-
| 7 || [mom] 'nephew, maternal' || *mɔːm 'mother's brother' || *mom 'mother's brother'
|-
| 8 || [ahwoe] 'grandmother' || *ap(e,o)ːk 'grandmother' || *apok 'grandmother'
|-
| 9 || [khendoke] 'outer ear' || *kindɔːŋg 'inner ear' || *kende 'ear'
|-
| 10 || [mgat-ɺam] 'in the mouth' || *maŋgat 'mouth, chin' || *maŋgot 'mouth'
|}

Kamula and Aramia River
Kamula loanwords from Aramia River languages:

{| class="wikitable"
! No. !! Kamula !! Waruna !! Gogodala
|-
| 1 ||  'taro' || [bibi] 'taro' || [bibi] 'taro'
|-
| 2 ||  'yam' ||  || [waisa] 'yam'
|-
| 3 ||  'canoe' || [gwawa] 'canoe' || [gawa] 'canoe'
|-
| 4 ||  'paddle, oar' || [keari] 'paddle' || [keari] 'paddle'
|-
| 5 ||  'chicken' || [kakaba] 'fowl' || 
|-
| 6 ||  'breadfruit' || [kawaki] 'breadfruit' || 
|}

Kamula–Elevala and Awyu–Dumut
Potential cognates between Kamula–Elevala and Awyu–Dumut (Healey 1970):

Abbreviations
pAD = proto-Awyu–Dumut
pA = proto-Awyu
pD = proto-Dumut
pKE = proto-Kamula–Elevala
pK = proto-Kamula
pE = proto-Elevala

{| class="wikitable sortable"
! Awyu–Dumut (Healey 1970) !! Kamula–Elevala
|-
| pAD *dat- 'hear' || pKE *dade- 'hear'
|-
| pAD *do- 'be cooked' || pKE *du- 'burn, cook'
|-
| pAD *ɛdex- 'give' || pE *dæ- 'give'
|-
| pAD *füp 'name' || pKE *hi 'name'
|-
| pAD *göp 'you (sg.)' || pE *go 'you (sg.)'
|-
| pAD *ket 'flower' || Pa [ke] 'blossom'
|-
| pAD *mak 'shoulder' || pKE *makæ 'shoulder'
|-
| pAD *nop 'I' || pE *nɔ 'I'
|-
| pAD *or 'excreta, intestines' || Kamula /o/ 'abdomen, belly'
|-
| pAD *xaiban 'head' || Pa [keba] 'head'
|-
| pAD *xop 'male, man' || pKE *kopo 'man'
|-
| pAD *yin 'tree, wood, fire' || Pa [ẽ] 'tree'
|-
| pA *bu 'buttocks' || pE *po 'buttocks'
|-
| pA *dübe, *dübi 'island' || Aekyom [dupi] 'island'
|-
| pA *düb(-ro) 'heart' || Kamula  'heart'
|-
| pA *makan, *mokan 'low, beneath' || pE *moka 'below'
|-
| pA *midi(n) 'thigh' || pKE *madina 'thigh'
|-
| pA *wün 'liver' || Pa [wumɛ] 'liver'
|-
| pA *xui(-to) 'sky' || Aekyom [khwoe] 'sky, heaven'
|-
| pD *ba- 'sit' || pKE *pV- 'sit'
|-
| pD *kumöt 'thunder' || pE *kima(ti) 'thunder'
|}

References

External links 
 Timothy Usher, New Guinea World, Proto–Digul River – Ok
 Usher & Suter, Proto–Kamula – Elevala River

 
Languages of Western Province (Papua New Guinea)